In Marxism, class consciousness is the set of beliefs that a person holds regarding their social class or economic rank in society, the structure of their class, and their class interests. According to Karl Marx, it is an awareness that is key to sparking a revolution that would "create a dictatorship of the proletariat, transforming it from a wage-earning, property-less mass into the ruling class".

Marxist theory 
Early in the 19th century, the labels "working classes" and "middle classes" were already coming into common usage: "The old hereditary aristocracy, reinforced by the new gentry who owed their success to commerce, industry, and the professions, evolved into an "upper class". Its consciousness was formed in part by public schools (in the British sense where it refers to a form of private school) and Universities. The upper class tenaciously maintained control over the political system, depriving not only the working classes but the middle classes of a voice in the political process".

While German theorist Karl Marx rarely used the term "class consciousness", he did make the distinction between "class in itself", which is defined as a category of people having a common relation to the means of production; and a "class for itself", which is defined as a stratum organized in active pursuit of its own interests.

Defining a person's social class can be a determinant for their awareness of it. Marxists define classes on the basis of their relation to the means of production, especially on whether they own capital. Non-Marxist social scientists distinguish various social strata on the basis of income, occupation, or status.

Whereas Marx believed that the proletariat achieved class consciousness as a result of experiences of exploitation, later orthodox Marxism, in particular Vladimir Lenin, believed that the working class by itself could only achieve "trade union consciousness" and thus needed a vanguard party of intellectuals outside the class to bring class consciousness to it.

In order to achieve a unity of theory and praxis, theory must not only tend toward reality in an attempt to change it; reality must also tend towards theory. Otherwise, the historical process leads a life of its own, while theorists make their own little theories, desperately waiting for some kind of possible influence over the historical process. Henceforth, reality itself must tend toward the theory, making it the "expression of the revolutionary process itself". In turn, a theory which has as its goal helping the proletariat achieve class consciousness must first be an "objective theory of class consciousness". However, theory in itself is insufficient, and ultimately relies on the struggle of humankind and of the proletariat for consciousness: the "objective theory of class consciousness is only the theory of its objective possibility".

Criticism 
Austrian School economist Ludwig von Mises argued that "Marx confus[ed] the notions of caste and class". Mises allowed that class consciousness and the associated class struggle were valid concepts in some circumstances where rigid social castes exist, e.g. when slavery is legal and slaves thus share a common motive for ending their disadvantaged status relative to other castes, but that class is an arbitrary distinction in capitalism where there is equality before the law. Von Mises' follower Murray Rothbard argued that Marx's efforts to portray the workers and capitalists as two monolithic groups was false as workers and capitalists would routinely compete within themselves, such as capitalist entrepreneurs competing amongst themselves or native workers competing with immigrant workers. Rothbard argued that if there is constant conflict between different members of the same class, then it is absurd to argue that these members have objective interests with one another against another class.

See also 

 False consciousness
 Psychology of social class

References

External links 

Marxist theory
Social concepts
Consciousness
Identity politics
Social classes